Richard Copeland Slocum (born November 7, 1944), is a former American football player and coach. He served as the interim athletic director at Texas A&M University from January through June 2019, and previously served as the head football coach there from 1989 to 2002. He has won more games as coach (123) than anyone else in Texas A&M Aggies football history. Slocum was inducted into the College Football Hall of Fame as a coach in 2012.

Personal
Raised in Orange, Texas, Slocum  graduated from Stark High School in Orange in 1963 and attended McNeese State University in Lake Charles, Louisiana. Slocum earned a B.S. in physical education in 1967 and M.S. in educational administration in 1968, both from McNeese State. He has two sons; the older, Shawn Slocum, was an assistant coach at Texas A&M under his father and has been the special teams coordinator for the Arizona State Sun Devils since 2015.

Coaching career

Early career
Slocum began his career as a football coach at  Lake Charles High School in 1968. Two years later, in 1970, Slocum became a graduate assistant at Kansas State University under head coach Vince Gibson, also coaching the offensive linemen on the freshman team. In 1971, he was named head freshman coach.

USC
Slocum spent the 1981 season as the defensive coordinator at the University of Southern California (USC) under John Robinson. Slocum's defense led the Pacific-10 Conference in total defense that season. The team lost to Penn State in the 1982 Fiesta Bowl, finishing with a 9–3 record.

Texas A&M
In 1972, Slocum was hired as receivers coach under Emory Bellard at Texas A&M University. After one year of coaching the receivers, he was moved to defense to coach the defensive ends, and in 1976, he became linebackers coach. Bellard left A&M in 1978, moving on to Mississippi State and taking defensive coordinator Melvin Robertson with him. Former A&M offensive coordinator and new head coach Tom Wilson chose Slocum as his defensive coordinator in 1979. After serving USC as defensive coordinator in 1981, Slocum returned to A&M in 1982 as defensive coordinator under Jackie Sherrill. In 1985, Slocum was elevated to assistant head coach. Slocum substituted for Sherrill and served as acting head coach for A&M's 18–0 victory over TCU during the 1988 season which was Sherrill's last.

Head coach

In December 1988, Sherrill was forced to resign, and Slocum was named his successor. During his 14 years as head coach, Slocum led the Aggies to a record of 123–47–2, making him the winningest coach in Texas A&M history. During his career, Slocum never had a losing season and won four conference championships, including the Big 12 title in 1998 and two Big 12 South Championships in 1997 and 1998. Additionally, he led the Aggies to become the first school in Southwest Conference history to post three consecutive perfect conference seasons and actually went four consecutive seasons without a conference loss. Slocum reached 100 wins faster than any other active coach. He has the best winning percentage in SWC history, one spot ahead of the legendary coach Darrell Royal who is number 2.

Under his tenure, Slocum helped make A&M's Kyle Field one of the hardest places to play in the nation, only losing 12 home games in 14 years, going parts of seven seasons without a home loss. After a home loss to Arkansas on November 24, 1989 (which broke a streak of 19 consecutive SWC home victories), they would not lose again in College Station until December 2, 1995 when his Aggies lost to Texas 16-6, although they did tie Baylor (20-20) on October 20, 1990. With Miami's 58-game, nine-season home winning streak ending in 1994, A&M owned the longest active home winning streak in the nation for much of 1994 and 1995. In the 1990s, A&M lost only four times at Kyle Field. Slocum was named SWC Coach of the Year three times during his tenure as head coach. His "Wrecking Crew" defense led the SWC in four statistical categories from 1991 through 1993 and led the nation in total defense in 1991.

Over 50 Texas A&M players were drafted into the NFL during Slocum's career as head coach.

Slocum inherited an Aggie football program that had just finished 7-5 and had been slapped with severe NCAA sanctions for violations under Sherrill. He didn't take long to clean up the program. He was quoted in 2002 as saying:

After fourteen years as head coach, Slocum was forced to resign in 2002 following only the second non-winning season of his career, and his only losing record in conference play. He immediately assumed a position as special adviser to Texas A&M president Robert Gates.

In May 2012, Slocum was inducted into the College Football Hall of Fame.

On April 19, 2019, Slocum was named interim athletic director for Texas A&M after the sudden departure of Scott Woodward to LSU.

Head coaching record

See also
 Legends Poll

References

External links
 Texas A&M profile (archived June 6, 2002)
 

1944 births
Living people
American football tight ends
Kansas State Wildcats football coaches
McNeese Cowboys football players
Texas A&M Aggies athletic directors
Texas A&M Aggies football coaches
USC Trojans football coaches
High school football coaches in Louisiana
College Football Hall of Fame inductees
College Football Playoff Selection Committee members
People from Oakdale, Louisiana
People from Orange, Texas
Coaches of American football from Texas
Players of American football from Texas